The 1996 Russian Figure Skating Championships took place in Samara from December 26 to 30, 1995. Skaters competed in the disciplines of men's singles, ladies' singles, pair skating, and ice dancing. The results were one of the criteria used to pick the Russian teams to the 1996 World Championships and the 1996 European Championships.

Senior results

Men

Ladies

Pairs

Ice dancing

External links
 pairs on ice

1995 in figure skating
Russian Figure Skating Championships, 1996
Figure skating
Russian Figure Skating Championships
December 1995 sports events in Russia